Killstad is a populated place in Karlstad Municipality, Värmland County, Sweden.

References

Populated places in Värmland County